Khumbo Hasting Kachali is a Malawian politician who was Vice President of Malawi from April 2012 to May 2014, serving under President Joyce Banda. He is credited with being the first vice president from the Northern Region of Malawi. The three previous vice presidents came from the central and southern regions. Kachali previously held a number of cabinet positions between 2004 and 2010.

Early life and education
Khumbo Kachali was born in 1966 and attended Phwezi Secondary School. He subsequently obtained a Diploma in Project Management from the University of Cambridge, England. He obtained his Master of Science Degree in Strategic Management in 2011 from the University of Derby, England. For his MSc thesis, he wrote a paper titled the Impact of Multiparty Politics on the socio-economic lives of people using his Mzimba constituency as a case study. Derby University of the UK proudly announced their former student and academic product's ascendancy to Malawi's vice presidency on its university website on 13 April 2012.

Before entering politics, Kachali was Second Vice-President for the Malawi Chamber of Commerce and Industry and he has been a businessman for years running various enterprises based in Mzuzu and large farming enterprise in Mzimba, his home district. Kachali is a well known Philanthropist assisting many people in education, start-up business capitals and Religious work

Political career
Kachali was treasurer general for the United Democratic Front (UDF) from 2002 to 2004. Kachali was elected to parliament in May 2004. In 2005 he was appointed as second vice-president of the Democratic Progressive Party (DPP). He was Minister of Industry, Science & Technology (2004-2006), Deputy Minister for Home Affairs & Internal Security (2006-2007) and Minister of Youth Development & Sports (2007-2008). From 2008 until 2009 he was Minister of Health. He is credited to have been one of very few effective health ministers, bringing together all health sector partners to provide quality services. As vice president, he would later use this experience as minister of health to quell a health staff boycott over allowances at Kamuzu Central Hospital in June 2012. His return also saw the return of essential drugs into Malawi public hospitals, which are the largest healthcare services for the poor after months of pharmacies running dry.

Kachali was appointed Minister of Transport and Public Infrastructure in the cabinet that became effective on 15 June 2009. 
He lost his ministerial position in the cabinet shake-up of 9 August 2010.
As Vice President Kachali has been seen as a workhorse of the Joyce Banda administration being delegated to handle controversial and political matters including scandals involving fellow Cabinet Members, management of food shortages and political negotiations with some of the key political leaders. Kachali is credited for engineering defections of high-profile opposition leaders to the ruling Peoples Party. Internally though, some Peoples Party founders and their stooges have been working hard to tarnish his image by fermenting lies or putting up independent candidates in the recent bye-elections in his Mzimba South West Constituency and Mzimba Central where they expected the PP to lose and discredit him. The PP won his former constituency with a majority of over 5000 sending his detractors into political wilderness. He is one of the political heavy weights in the northern region of Malawi.

He represented Malawi at the African Union summit in the year 2012 where he helped champion the election of the first female AU Chairperson Nkosazana Dlamini-Zuma through his well documented support for women empowerment. He also left a landmark on the diplomatic scene by being President Banda's vocal face on the banning of Sudan's fugitive president Al Bashir from attending the initially Malawi bound 2012 AU summit that was as a consequence of the landmark ban transferred to Ethiopia.

His unprecedented hand-pick appointment has raised questions as to whether he enjoys the same immunity that his elected predecessors had over being fired by a standing president. Two of his predecessors, Joyce Banda and Cassim Chilumpha were on separate occasions only saved by the constitution when the then vexed president wanted their heads to roll for what may best be described by some as alleged political insecurities or machinations.

As first vice president of the ruling Peoples Party, he has been at the centre of bringing parliamentary and political stability and he is regarded as "the most loyal and trusted" boy of President Joyce Banda and that has earned him constant attacks from his political competitors, who believe attacking him would weaken the President, who is set for her first presidential election in May 2014.

Rt. Hon. Khumbo Kachali is now the president and founding member of Freedom Party, which was registered with the Registrar of Political parties in Malawi in 2017.

References

1966 births
Living people
Alumni of the University of Cambridge
Vice-presidents of Malawi
Government ministers of Malawi
Democratic Progressive Party (Malawi) politicians
Alumni of the University of Derby
United Democratic Front (Malawi) politicians
People's Party (Malawi) politicians